Border Security: Australia's Front Line is an Australian factual television programme in the form of an observational documentary that airs on the Seven Network. The show follows the work of officers of the Department of Home Affairs, Australian Border Force, and the Australian Quarantine and Inspection Service as they enforce Australian immigration, customs, quarantine and finance laws. All three of these government agencies cooperate with filming.

Most of the programme is filmed at Sydney, Melbourne and Brisbane airports; scenes from the Sydney international mail arrival facility are also shown. Occasionally, the programme features other locations such as Perth Airport, seaports, international mail centres, raids on workplaces suspected of employing persons contrary to the restrictions of their visa or immigrant status and the work of Australian Border Force vessels and aircraft in the waters of Northern Australia.

The series has so far produced 15 series as of 2021.

Broadcast
The show premiered in Australia in 2004 and became a ratings hit. The first series was hosted by Grant Bowler, who stopped appearing on camera in subsequent series; however Bowler continues to provide the voice over for every episode. It is classified PG. The series also airs on the Australian pay TV channel The LifeStyle Channel and overseas on the Australia Network.

The show is also broadcast internationally. In New Zealand, it airs on TVNZ's TV1, as well as eden. It airs in the United Kingdom on Sky Witness, Pick and Sky Crime, and in Ireland on Virgin Media One (airing as Nothing to Declare in both the UK and Ireland), in the United States on Universo (TV channel).

It airs on Tele 5 in Poland (in Polish), on vtm in Belgium and on Veronica in the Netherlands, where it is dubbed into Dutch. It is broadcast as Grensevakten in Norway on TVNorge.

Border Security also airs across Asia in countries such as Hong Kong, Malaysia , South Korea, Thailand and Macau. In Singapore it airs on Fox Crime. In Canada, the series airs on BBC Canada and DTour.

Criticism 
Writer Bob Burton in his book Inside Spin: The Dark Underbelly of the PR Industry expressed concern that the television show, by being subject to post-production editing, allows the producers to remove anything that shows any mistakes made by the government agencies concerned.  Instead, Burton argues, the show gives the viewing public the sense that the government is effectively and fairly administrating border security policy.

In 2009 Media Watch suggested that the Department of Immigration and Citizenship used its working relationship with Seven as leverage for an apology to its National Communications Manager, Sandi Logan, who had appeared in an unflattering light on a Today Tonight report. Media Watch'''s sources claimed that persons in the Department threatened to cease co-operation with Seven in the production of future Border Security episodes.

In November 2014, American sex work activist Monica Jones (who is an African American transgender woman) was detained in Villawood Immigration Detention Centre after the Department of Immigration and Border Protection cancelled her tourist visa at Sydney Airport. Jones commented that producers for Border Security "knew details of what Immigration was going to do to me" and that "It was about 30 seconds before the cameras showed up... and tried to get me on their TV show" Jones was asked by an immigration officer "Are you OK if they continue to film" when she had already demanded that the TV cameras leave.

Episodes

 Season 1 (2004) 

Season 2 (2005)

Season 3 (2006)

Season 4 (2006–2007)

 Season 5 (2007) 

 Season 6 (2008) 

 Season 7 (2009)

Season 8 (2009)

Season 9 (2010)

Season 10 (2015)

Season 11 (2016)

Season 12 (2017)

Season 13 (2018)

Season 14 (2019–2020)

Season 15 (2021)
Season 15 consisted of 22 episodes and screened in 2021.

Series ratings

International versions
A Canadian version of the show, titled Border Security: Canada's Front Line, began airing in 2012 in Canada. It was cancelled after three seasons, due to the Canadian Privacy Commissioner ruling that the show and the CBSA had breached the privacy act.

A US version of the show, titled Homeland Security USA, began airing in 2009 in the United States. It ran for 13 episodes, two of which have never been aired.

A British version of the show, titled Nothing to Declare UK, aired in 2011 in the United Kingdom.

A Latin American version of the show, titled Alerta Aeropuerto filmed at El Dorado Airoport in Bogota, Colombia and Jorge Chavez Airoport in Lima, Peru began airing 2016 in Latin America on National Geographic Channel.

A second American version called Border Security: America's Front Line'' started airing on ABC in September 2016.

See also
Border Patrol (TV series)

References

External links 
 
 

Australian factual television series
Seven Network original programming
2004 Australian television series debuts
2000s Australian television series
2010s Australian television series
2020s Australian television series
Borders of Australia
Television series by Seven Productions
Television series about border control